The  is a Shintō shrine in the city of Katori in Chiba Prefecture, Japan. It is the ichinomiya of former Shimōsa Province, and is the head shrine of the approximately 400 Katori shrines around the country (located primarily in the Kantō region). The main festival of the shrine is held annually on April 14, with a three-day Grand Festival held every 12 years.

Enshrined kami
The primary kami of Katori Jingū is
 , the kami of swords and lightning, and a general of Amaterasu.

History
The foundation of Katori Jingū predates the historical period. Per the Hitachi-koku Fudoki, an ancient record and per shrine tradition, it was established in 643 BC, the 18th year of the reign of Emperor Jimmu. During this period, the  migrated from Higo Province in Kyushu, conquering local emishi tribes, and forming an alliance with the nearby Nakatomi clan, the progenitors of the Fujiwara clan at what is now Kashima Jingū. As the Hitachi-koku Fudoki dates from the early 7th century, the shrine must certainly have been founded earlier than this. The shrine appears in all of the Rikkokushi official national histories, which cover events to 887. The shrine was regarded as a tutelary shrine of the Fujiwara clan, and a bunrei of Futsunushi was brought from Katori to be enshrined in the second sanctuary of Kasuga Taisha when that shrine was founded in Nara. In the Heian period, the shrine came to be regarded as the ichinomiya of the province.

During the Kamakura and Muromachi periods, Katori Jingū was revered as a shrine for the military class and received many donations from Minamoto no Yoritomo and Ashikaga Takauji. It also earned income from its control of fishing rights in the Katori Sea and highway barriers in both Hitachi Province and Shimōsa. Under the Edo Period Tokugawa shogunate, the shrine was rebuilt in 1607, and again in 1700. Many of the structures in the present shrine date from this 1700 rebuilding.

During the Meiji period era of State Shinto, the shrine was rated as a  under the Modern system of ranked Shinto Shrines

Cultural Properties

National Treasures
 ,  Tang Dynasty China. This round cupronickel mirror has a diameter of 29.6 centimeters, and weight of 4.56 kilograms. It  is decorated with bas-relief flowers, insects and a variety of real and mythological animals. It is almost identical to a mirror held by the Shōsōin Treasury in Nara. The mirror itself is preserved at the Nara National Museum. It was designated a National Treasure in 1953.

Important Cultural Properties 
 Honden, Edo Period (1700).  The Honden of Katori Shrine was traditionally reconstructed every 20 years, similar to the system used at Ise Shrine until the system fell apart during the Sengoku period. The current structure was built in 1700 and was designated as Important Cultural Property in 1977.
 Rōmon, Edo Period (1700). The Rōmon gate of Katori Shrine was also constructed in 1700 and was designated an Important Cultural Property in 1983. It displays the shrine's name plaque written by Fleet Admiral Tōgō Heihachirō.
 , Kamakura to Muromachi period.  The shrine has a ceramic Koseto pair of komainu, standing 17.6 and 17.9 centimeters high. One of these statues was featured on a 250 Yen definitive stamp of Japan. The set of statues was designated as an Important Cultural Property in 1953.
 , Heian period. This mirror has a diameter 20.5 cm and is made of white copper. It is inscribed with the date of 1149, and is the oldest example of an inscribed Japanese mirror. The style is different from general Japanese mirrors, and was influenced by Song Dynasty China or Goryeo. It was designated on November 14, 1953.
 , Heian to Edo period. This is a set of 381 documents that was in the possession of the Katori clan, the hereditary priesthood of the shrine. It was collectively designated on November 14, 1953.

Registered Tangible Cultural Properties
 , Meiji period. This two-story, hipped-roof Japanese-style building is located on the southeast side of the Katori Jingu Shrine and has been used for meetings. It was designated in 2000.
 , Showa period. This building was constructed during a major renovation from 1945 by the Shrine Bureau of the Ministry of Home Affairs. It was designated in 2001.

Gallery

See also
 Ichinomiya
List of Jingū
List of Shinto shrines
Iizasa Choisai Ienao
Tenshin Shōden Katori Shintō-ryū
List of National Treasures of Japan (crafts-others)
, the Imperial Japanese Navy light cruiser  named after the shrine

Notes

References

 Plutschow, Herbe. Matsuri: The Festivals of Japan. RoutledgeCurzon (1996) 
 Ponsonby-Fane, Richard Arthur Brabazon. (1962).   Studies in Shinto and Shrines. Kyoto: Ponsonby Memorial Society. OCLC 3994492
 . (1959).  The Imperial House of Japan. Kyoto: Ponsonby Memorial Society. OCLC 194887

External links

Official site of the shrine

Beppyo shrines
Jingū
Important Cultural Properties of Japan
National Treasures of Japan
Shinto shrines in Chiba Prefecture
Tourist attractions in Chiba Prefecture
Shimōsa Province
Ichinomiya
Katori, Chiba
Kanpei-taisha